Leucine carboxyl methyltransferase 1 is an enzyme that in humans is encoded by the LCMT1 gene.

Interactions 

LCMT1 has been shown to interact with FXR2.

References

Further reading